Kayseri Atatürk Stadium, opened in 1964, was a multi-purpose stadium in Kayseri, Turkey.  It was mainly used for football matches, and was shared by the two largest clubs in the region, Kayserispor who currently play in the Süper Lig and Kayseri Erciyesspor who were last season relegated into the Turkish Second Division.  The stadium was able to hold 26,500 people, and was mostly uncovered.

During a match between Kayseri Erciyesspor and Sivasspor on September 17, 1967, it was the location of the worst sporting-related disaster occurred in Turkey.

In 2009, it was replaced by Kadir Has Stadium, located on a different site with a capacity in excess of 32,000 seats. Kayseri Atatürk Stadium was demolished and its land will host a multi-use real estate project, including a shopping mall, hotel, offices, and residential buildings.

References

External links
 Various photos of the stadium

Football venues in Turkey
Defunct sports venues in Turkey
Demolished buildings and structures in Turkey
Sports venues completed in 1964
Sports venues demolished in 2009
Sport in Kayseri
Multi-purpose stadiums in Turkey
Defunct association football venues in Turkey
Süper Lig venues
Stadium